Mark Rosenberg (October 22, 1948 – November 6, 1992) was an American film producer whose works included The Killing Fields and Presumed Innocent, who was the President of Worldwide Theatrical Production at Warner Bros. in the 1980s.

Early life and education
Rosenberg was born and raised in a Conservative Jewish family, in Passaic, New Jersey, where he attended Passaic High School, graduating in 1966. He attended Bard College and the University of Wisconsin–Madison, where he was an active leader in the Students for a Democratic Society and its protests against United States involvement in the Vietnam War. Mark's younger brother, Alan, became an actor, Alan later said, "to effect social and political change" and eventually became SAG President. Their first cousin, also from Passaic, was musician/songwriter Donald Fagen, co-founder of the group Steely Dan.

Career
He moved to Los Angeles to take a position in film marketing with Seineger & Associates. He was hired as a literary agent with International Creative Management and later with Adams, Ray & Rosenberg.

He became vice president for production at Warner Bros. in 1978. Rosenberg was named by Warner Bros. as the president of movie production in July 1983, making him one of the youngest executives to head the film production division of a major motion picture studio, at the age of 35. Rosenberg replaced Robert Shapiro, whose departure was attributed in industry sources cited by The New York Times as due to poor financial results for the studio's film in the previous 18 months. He left Warner Bros. in September 1985.

He joined Sydney Pollack in 1985 at Mirage Productions, where their first production was the 1988 release Bright Lights, Big City, based on the novel by Jay McInerney. Other films produced at Mirage include Major League and Presumed Innocent.

Spring Creek Productions was formed in 1989 with his wife, producer Paula Weinstein. He met his wife while they were organizing protests at the 1972 Republican National Convention at the event's original planned site in San Diego. The company had a production agreement with Warner Bros., where they produced The Fabulous Baker Boys, and Flesh and Bone, the film he was producing at the time of his death.

Personal life and death
Rosenberg, a resident of Los Angeles, died at age 44 on November 6, 1992, of heart failure on a movie set in Stanton, Texas, during the production of the film Flesh and Bone.

His brother, Alan Rosenberg, is an actor who has been the president of the Screen Actors Guild.

Rosenberg was described as "one of Hollywood's baby moguls" by The New York Times, which noted that "the roll call of achievements in his obituary was of a length befitting an elder statesman of Hollywood".

Filmography
He was a producer in all films unless otherwise noted.

Film

Thanks

Television

References

Film producers from California
Bard College alumni
Members of Students for a Democratic Society
Businesspeople from Los Angeles
University of Wisconsin–Madison alumni
1948 births
1992 deaths
20th-century American Jews
Passaic High School alumni
People from Passaic, New Jersey
20th-century American businesspeople
Activists from California
Film producers from New Jersey